Eastmaninstitutet (The Eastman Institute) is a dental care centre specialized in orthodontics, periodontology and oral surgery located in Vasastaden, Stockholm, Sweden. It was built by a million dollar donation from the American inventor George Eastman and opened in 1937.

References

External links 

 Photographs of the building from the 1930s from the University of Rochester

Buildings and structures in Stockholm
Dental organizations
Pediatric organizations
1937 establishments in Sweden
Medical and health organizations based in Sweden